Beccaria is an Italian surname and place name.

People
Alessandro Beccaria (born 1988), Italian footballer 
Angelo Beccaria (1820–1897), was an Italian landscape painter 
Battista Beccario (15th-century), Genoese cartographer
Cesare Beccaria, or Marquis of Beccaria-Bonesana (1738 –1794), famous Italian jurist and philosopher, argued for abolition of death penalty
Giovanni Battista Beccaria (1716 – 1781), Italian physicist
Ippolito Maria Beccaria (1550 –1600), Dominican Preachers
José Manuel Romay Beccaría (born 1934), Spanish lawyer and politician
Lola Beccaria (born 1963), Spanish writer
Mario Beccaria (1920–2003), Italian politician 
Vania Beccaria (born 1973), retired Italian female volleyball player

Places
Beccaria Township, Clearfield County, Pennsylvania
Beccaria, Clearfield County, Pennsylvania, an unincorporated community with the same name as the township
Montù Beccaria - comune in Province of Pavia, Region of Lombardy, Italy
Piazza Cesare Beccaria - City square or plaza in Florence, Italy